Nazarín is a 1959 Mexican satirical drama film directed by Luis Buñuel and co-written between Buñuel and Julio Alejandro, adapted from the eponymous novel of Benito Pérez Galdós.

The film received the international prize at the 1959 Cannes Film Festival and was selected as the Mexican entry for the Best Foreign Language Film at the 32nd Academy Awards, but was not selected as a nominee.

Although not one of Buñuel's most renowned films, Nazarin still holds a high reputation. Filmmaker Andrei Tarkovsky named it one of his ten favorite films. In April 2019, a restoration was selected to be shown in the "Cannes Classics" section at the 2019 Cannes Film Festival.

Plot 

Padre Nazario, a Catholic priest living in a poor hostel, is quiet, temperate and distributes his money, even indifferent to being burgled. He demonstrates understanding and compassion to those such as Beatriz, who has psychotic episodes and suicidal thoughts after being cast aside by her lover, Pinto.

A prostitute, Andara, runs into Nazario's room seeking shelter; she has murdered another prostitute and been wounded. Nazario withholds judgement and helps to  conceal her. He tries to make her conscious of her guilt in a religious context. Andara hallucinates that a portrait of Jesus Christ is laughing at her. Beatriz warns that someone has informed the authorities. Meanwhile, the proprietress finds out and insists Andara must not be discovered with Nazario, ordering Andara to remove evidence of her stay. After Nazario has left, Andara sets the room ablaze and escapes.

With Nazario now afoul of the law and church, he is warned an investigation could cost him his priesthood. Having no possessions - they have all been stolen or given away - he adopts plain clothes and wanders the country, begging.

Meeting a construction crew, Nazario offers to work for food, but other workers resent him as they are working for money. They make him unwelcome, so Nazario leaves with nothing. But his poor ways are misunderstood, so a fight between the workers and the foreman ensues.

"As if by a miracle," Nazario sees Beatriz in another town. He reveals his possessions have been stolen. She leads him to Andara, who is living with her, and a sick girl whose mother begs Nazario to cure the girl with a miracle. Nazario suggests a doctor, but offers to pray with them. He is perturbed when the woman performs superstitious rites. The girl's fever subsides. Believing Nazario to be a miracle-worker, Andara and Beatriz follow him despite his protests.

Nazario stops to help a party whose horse has a broken leg. The Colonel yells at a peasant who does not acknowledge them, despite the peasant's protestations that he didn't see them. Nazario criticises Colonel for his rudeness. The Colonel tries to pull his gun, but is stopped by the Priest, who excuses Nazario as "a heretic, an erratic preacher" who should be left alone.

Nazario is followed by Beatriz and Andara, whom he reluctantly accepts, although lecturing them about God. In a plague-ridden village, Nazario's help is rejected by one dying woman, who would rather be comforted by her husband (inspired by the Marquis de Sade's Dialogue Between a Priest and a Dying Man). Nazario is overcome by a feeling of failure.

A midget professes love for Andara despite saying she is ugly. Pinto, who is visiting the area, sees Beatriz, accuses her of being "a priest's lover" and demands that she leave with him. Nazario says she is struggling with Satan but should resist temptation. When she asks how he guessed something was wrong, Nazario responds, "It's not guessing, it's knowing."

Andara insists that they must flee. Nazario responds only thieves flee and the divine will not forsake them. Beatriz tells Nazario she trusts him, and quotes from the Bible: "If I can carry your load on my back, I will." Andara accuses Nazario of loving Beatriz more, but he tries to demonstrate a Christian love for both.

Discovered by a search party, Andara and Nazario are arrested: Beatriz begs for his release. Pinto tells Beatriz's mother that Beatriz should go with him. When Beatriz meets her mother, Beatriz sings Nazario's praises and speaks of his miracles. Her mother's response that Beatriz loves Nazario "like a man" sends Beatriz into a psychotic episode.

Nazario's cellmates insult and physically abuse him. Nazario suffers a crisis of faith, shouting, "For the first time in my life, I find it hard to forgive. But I forgive you. It is my Christian duty. But I also scorn you! And I feel guilty, not knowing how to separate scorn from forgiveness." A cellmate intervenes and Nazario gives him his money.

Nazario is accused of insanity and disobedience. As he is led away, Pinto and Beatriz pass by, but without recognition. Nazario passes a fruit seller who offers a pineapple, saying, "Take this charity, and may God be with you." Nazario seems overcome with confusion. He refuses it twice, but then takes it and says, "May God repay you." He is led away, distraught.

Cast
 Francisco Rabal – Father Nazario
 Marga López – Beatriz
 Rita Macedo – Andara
 Jesús Fernández – Hugo
 Ignacio López Tarso – Thief in church
 Luis Aceves Castañeda – Parricide
 Ofelia Guilmáin – Chanfa
 Noé Murayama – Pinto
 Rosenda Monteros – Prieta
 Victorio Blanco – Old prisoner
 Arturo Castro – Colonel
 José Chávez – Construction site manager (as José Chávez 'Trowe')
 Cecilia Leger – Woman with pineapple
 Ignacio Peón – Priest

See also
 List of submissions to the 32nd Academy Awards for Best Foreign Language Film
 List of Mexican submissions for the Academy Award for Best Foreign Language Film

References

External links

1959 films
1959 drama films
Films with atheism-related themes
Mexican drama films
1950s Spanish-language films
Mexican black-and-white films
Films about Catholic priests
Films about Catholicism
Films critical of the Catholic Church
Films based on Spanish novels
Films based on works by Benito Pérez Galdós
Films directed by Luis Buñuel
1950s Mexican films